Puppet Master (also titled The Puppet Master and Puppetmaster) is a 1989 American horror film written by Charles Band and Kenneth J. Hall, and directed by David Schmoeller. The film stars Paul Le Mat, Irene Miracle, Matt Roe and Kathryn O'Reilly as psychics who are plotted against by a former colleague, using puppets animated by an Egyptian spell.

Originally intended for summer 1989 theatrical release, before being released on home video the following September, Puppet Master was ultimately pushed to a direct-to-video release on October 12, 1989, as Band felt this was likely to be more financially successful than the theatrical market. It was very popular and has since developed a large cult following, and  a franchise.

Plot
1939, Bodega Bay Inn, California: An old puppeteer named André Toulon is putting the finishing touches on his newest puppet, Jester, before he brings it to life. Two Nazi spies arrive and head for Toulon's room while Kahn, another living puppet, warns him. Toulon calmly places all the animate puppets in a chest and hides it in a wall panel compartment. As the Nazis break down the door, Toulon commits suicide.

Present day: Four psychics miles apart are all "contacted" by Neil Gallagher, all five of them previously being acquaintances: Professor Alex Whitaker through a nightmare involving Neil and leeches, Dana Hadley via a premonition of her own death, and psychic researchers Frank Forrester and Carissa Stamford through unspecified means. Dana has also uncovered Toulon's "hiding place" and tells the others, arranging a meeting at the Bodega Bay Inn, where Neil resides. Upon arrival, they are surprised to find that not only does Neil have a wife, Megan, but that he has also killed himself, leaving instructions for Megan on the others’ arrival. She leaves them with the body to pay respects and Dana stabs a long pin into Neil's corpse to verify that he is in fact dead.

While getting settled into their rooms, the psychics experience different confusing visions of Neil. That night at dinner, Dana intentionally riles Megan, causing her to leave the table and Pinhead, another animated doll, crawls out of Neil's casket. Alex follows Megan and tells her their history with her husband. Carissa, a psychometrist, can see any object's emotional history by touching it, Dana can tell fortunes and locate items and people, and Alex himself can foresee the future in his dreams. Neil was researching alchemy and with Frank's help discovered that Ancient Egyptians had created a method of reanimating inanimate figurines, a power also discovered by André Toulon, the last true alchemist. But because Neil had not made contact with them in a while, Dana and the rest thought that he had abandoned them and took whatever he was looking for, for himself, and they are there to take it and settle the score.

That night, Theresa the housekeeper attends to the fire and is attacked by Pinhead with a poker, fulfilling Dana's fortune for her. Gallagher's body has moved to a chair which Megan finds, causing her to faint; Alex attends to her while the others return the body to the casket. After Blade finds protective spells on Alex and Dana's rooms, he moves on to Carissa and Frank's, who are having very loud sex and disrupting Alex and Dana's sleep. Two more puppets, Tunneler and Leech Woman, enter. Tunneler kills Carissa by drilling into her face when she inspects a noise coming from under the bed and Leech Woman regurgitates leeches onto Frank, who's tied to the bed, draining his blood. Returning from a walk, Dana finds Gallagher's body in her room and she is attacked by Pinhead, who breaks her leg. Pinhead chases her and repeatedly strangles and punches her until she manages to knock him away and crawl to the elevator, only to have her throat slit by Blade, fulfilling her fortune.

Alex suffers more nightmares, eventually woken by Megan, who shows him Toulon's diary and tells him that Neil found Toulon's secret to reanimation. Alex has a vision of Neil and they rush downstairs to escape but find the bodies of Dana, Frank and Carissa sitting around the dining table accompanied by the newly resurrected Neil. He explains that while he did commit suicide, he used Toulon's secrets to become reanimated himself in an effort to become immortal. He reveals that he killed Megan's parents and expresses disgust for the puppets, violently throwing Jester, now satisfied to have human puppets to experiment with. The other puppets witness this and descend on Neil; Tunneler takes out his legs and Blade pins him down while Leech Woman regurgitates a leech into his mouth and Pinhead finally breaks his neck. The next day, Megan sees Alex off and as she ascends the stairs, she brings Dana's stuffed dog Leroy to life.

Cast

 William Hickey as André Toulon
 Paul Le Mat as Alex Whitaker, the main protagonist of the film; an anthropology professor at Yale University with the ability to dream of things yet to come 
 Irene Miracle as Dana Hadley, a small-time, fairground psychic specializing in fortune telling and locating lost/missing objects  
 Jimmie F. Skaggs as Neil Gallagher, the main antagonist of the film; he serves as the titular "puppet master" orchestrating the deaths of his former friends and colleagues at the hands of the animate puppets
 Robin Frates as Megan Gallagher, Neil's wife; her parents owned and operated the Bodega Bay, which she inherited when they died and which is also where she and Neil first met
 Matt Roe as Frank Forrester, a psychic researcher for Pensa Research Inc (PRI) & partner to Carissa; together they specialize in sexual psychic readings
 Kathryn O'Reilly as Carissa Stamford, a psychometrist for Pensa Research Inc (PRI) & partner to Frank, she often receives visions from past sexual trauma victims or couples being intimate together but can reconstruct the emotional history of any object through touch 
 Mews Small as Theresa, the Gallaghers’ housekeeper 
 Barbara Crampton as Woman at Carnival
 David Boyd as Buddy
 Peter Frankland as Max
 Andrew Kimbrough as Klaus

Featured puppets
 Blade
 Jester
 Pinhead
 Tunneler
 Leech Woman
 Shredder Khan
 Gengie

Release
Puppet Master was released on VHS by Paramount Home Video on October 12, 1989. The film saw its first DVD release on June 13, 2000, through Full Moon Home Video.

Following a release by Wizard Entertainment under The Puppet Master in March 2008, Wizard later released a Blu-ray in July 2010. Full Moon Features simultaneously released a remastered DVD.

In 2014, Echo Bridge Home Entertainment released the "Killjoy and Puppet Master: The Complete Collections" alongside the Killjoy series, although both series have since produced additional sequels.

On April 10, 2018, Full Moon issued both a Blu-ray and a limited-edition vintage VHS collection, with the latter having only 3,000 units produced, and the first 300 being signed and numbered by Charles Band.

Reception 

On Rotten Tomatoes, the film holds an approval rating of 43% based on seven reviews, with a weighted average rating of 4/10.

TV Guide gave a negative review calling it "a pointless variation on the killer-doll genre".

Dread Central awarded a score of 3/5, commending the atmosphere, soundtrack and set designs, but criticized the acting, weak script and first act. The review concluded their review by writing, "Puppet Master isn't what I would call a great film, but its heart is in the right place, and I've always been a huge fan of the evil doll subgenre of horror, making the film's shortcomings easily forgivable." Wes R. from Oh the Horror.com gave a positive review stating, "Despite its flaws, Puppet Master emerges as one of the more enjoyable of the 'killer toy' type horror films".

Legacy

The success as a cult film inspired a franchise that would span decades to come. Five sequels followed: Puppet Master II (1990), Puppet Master 4 (1993), Puppet Master 5: The Final Chapter (1994), Curse of the Puppet Master (1998) and Puppet Master: The Legacy (2003).

The third film, entitled Toulon's Revenge (1991), serves as a prequel, as would Retro Puppet Master (1999). Puppet Master: Axis of Evil (2010) began a loose prequel trilogy, followed by Axis Rising (2012) and Axis Termination (2017).

In 2020, a spin-off focusing on the puppet Blade was released, Blade: The Iron Cross. Another film, this one about Doktor Death (from Retro), is set for release in 2022.

Puppet Master vs. Demonic Toys, a crossover with fellow Full Moon franchise Demonic Toys, premiered on the Sci-Fi Channel in 2004.

Video game
In September 2021, Full Moon announced a partnership with independent game studio 'October Games' to release an official Puppet Master game, which was released to Steam on March 1, 2023 and received negative reviews.

References

3-D conversion
In March 2009, it was reported that Band was to remake the original film in 3-D.

References

External links
 
 
 
 

1989 films
1989 horror films
1989 direct-to-video films
1980s supernatural horror films
American supernatural horror films
Full Moon Features films
Puppet films
Films set in hotels
Films set in 1939
Films directed by David Schmoeller
Puppet Master (film series)
Films with screenplays by David Schmoeller
Films scored by Richard Band
American exploitation films
American direct-to-video films
Paramount Pictures direct-to-video films
American splatter films
1980s English-language films
1980s American films